Statistics of Emperor's Cup in the 1967 season. The cup was held between January 11 and January 14, 1968.

Overview
It was contested by 8 teams, and Toyo Industries won the championship.

Results

Quarterfinals
Kansai University 1–0 Nippon Kokan
Tokyo University of Education 1–3 Mitsubishi Motors
Chuo University 4–5 Yanmar Diesel
Kwansei Gakuin University 0–5 Toyo Industries

Semifinals
Kansai University 0–5 Mitsubishi Motors
Yanmar Diesel 1–2 Toyo Industries

Final

Mitsubishi Motors 0–1 Toyo Industries
Toyo Industries won the championship.

References
 NHK

Emperor's Cup
Emperor's Cup